Pain Jovin Rural District is a rural district (dehestan) in Helali District, Joghatai County, Razavi Khorasan Province, Iran. At the 2006 census, its population was 12,536, in 3,051 families.  The rural district includes 16 villages.

References 

Rural Districts of Razavi Khorasan Province
Joghatai County